Foo Keat Seong (born 22 May 1958) is a Malaysian field hockey player. He competed in the men's tournament at the 1984 Summer Olympics.

References

External links

1958 births
Living people
Malaysian sportspeople of Chinese descent
Malaysian male field hockey players
Olympic field hockey players of Malaysia
Field hockey players at the 1984 Summer Olympics
Place of birth missing (living people)
Asian Games medalists in field hockey
Asian Games bronze medalists for Malaysia
Medalists at the 1978 Asian Games
Medalists at the 1982 Asian Games
Field hockey players at the 1978 Asian Games
Field hockey players at the 1982 Asian Games